Coryanthes speciosa, the bat orchid, is a species of orchid found in Brazil, Colombia, Costa Rica, French Guiana, Guatemala, Guyana, Honduras, Mexico, Nicaragua, Panama, Peru, Suriname, Venezuela, the Caribbean and Belize.

As noted by the position of the "bucket", liquid drops in from above by a special stem gland.  The bucket fills, nectar drinking organisms such as bees are attracted to the sweet drops forming above the bucket.  As the bees jostle for position, some bees inadvertently fall into the bucket.  The bucket's fluid levels are regulated by a spout that allows overflowing liquid to be released.  This is the only escape for the drowning bees.  Whilst traveling through the spout, the anther's of the plant produce pollen that then sticks to the escaping bee.  Positioned perfectly at the end of the spout lies the stigma that must be crossed by the frantic bee.  Pollination is then assured, the bee is free to try its luck on other plants nearby.  Thus, even cross pollination is virtually inevitable.

References

External links

speciosa
Orchids of Central America
Orchids of Belize
Orchids of Brazil
Orchids of Colombia
Orchids of Costa Rica
Orchids of French Guiana
Orchids of Guatemala
Orchids of Guyana
Orchids of Honduras
Orchids of Mexico
Orchids of Nicaragua
Orchids of Panama
Orchids of Peru
Orchids of Suriname
Orchids of Venezuela
Flora of the Caribbean
Flora without expected TNC conservation status